Ab Oord (21 December 1885 – 3 August 1961) was a Dutch weightlifter. He competed in the men's heavyweight event at the 1924 Summer Olympics.

References

External links
 

1885 births
1961 deaths
Dutch male weightlifters
Olympic weightlifters of the Netherlands
Weightlifters at the 1924 Summer Olympics
Sportspeople from Gorinchem
20th-century Dutch people